Bright Shadow is a 1997 Iranian drama film  written and directed by Hossein Shahabi (Persian: حسین شهابی)

Starring
 Samin Gholami
 Nader Parchami
 Mahmood Shirazi
 Karim Nobakht
 Sara Kermani
 Azar Roohi
 Nader Karimian Sedaghat

Crew
 cinematography: Hamid Angaji
 Sound Recorder: Sasan Salimi
 Production manager: Nima Poutrhajar
 Editor: Shahin Karimi
 Music: Hossein Shahabi
 Production: Baran film house 1997

References

1997 films
Iranian drama films
Films directed by Hossein Shahabi